Lacerna is a genus of bryozoans belonging to the family Lacernidae.

The species of this genus are found in the Americas, southernmost Southern Hemisphere.

Species:

Lacerna arachnoides 
Lacerna aviculifera 
Lacerna baculifera 
Lacerna cavolini 
Lacerna convexa 
Lacerna eatoni 
Lacerna fissa 
Lacerna fuchsii 
Lacerna furcensis 
Lacerna gabriellae 
Lacerna gibbosa 
Lacerna hexagonalis 
Lacerna hosteensis 
Lacerna jacksonensis 
Lacerna nitens 
Lacerna nitidissima 
Lacerna ordinaria 
Lacerna ovalis 
Lacerna planata 
Lacerna problematica 
Lacerna styphelia 
Lacerna watersi

References

Bryozoan genera